Bougainvillia crassa is a marine invertebrate, a species of hydroid in the suborder Anthomedusae. It was first described by Frassa in 1938.

References

Bougainvilliidae
Animals described in 1938